Lusitanops gigasei is an extinct species of sea snail, a marine gastropod mollusk in the family Raphitomidae.

Description
The length of the shell attains 6.1 mm; its diameter 1.9 mm.

It may be an intermediate species between Lusitanops and Xanthodaphne, that shows almost the same characteristics.

Distribution
Fossils of this species were found in Pliocene strata at Kallo, Belgium; age range: 6 to 2.588 Ma.

References

gigasei
Gastropods described in 1998